The Land of Foam also known as At the Edge of Oikoumene and Great Arc is a novel written by Soviet writer Ivan Yefremov in 1946.

Plot summary
The novel is divided in two parts, separated by more than 1000 years.

The first part takes place during the rule of the pharaoh Djedefra (26th century BC), who decides to send an expedition to the South, in order to seek the famous and fabled Land of Punt and to seek the limits of the land and the start of the Great Arc, the circular ocean encompassing the entire world in Egyptian cosmology.

The second part starts in Ancient Greece during its Aegean Period (no precise dates are provided, but one can assume a date c. 1000–900 BC). A young sculptor named Pandion sets off on a journey to Crete, but he ends up on Phoenician Trading Ship ( while trying to escape captivity from some local wild Crete people), and after 4 days, he jumps the ship in the middle of the storm ( while escaping sacrifice from frightened sailors), and a storm finally lands him in Egypt, where he is enslaved. He manages to win his freedom and after a long and perilous journey comes back home. On the way, he carves a cameo which portrays his friends and some details of their adventures.

In a short framing narrative, modern researchers examine the cameo and contemplate its possible origins.

Notes

External links
 Ivan Yefremov, The Land of Foam. (in the Udmurt mirror of the Maksim Moshkow's Library)

1946 novels
Novels by Ivan Yefremov
Historical novels
Novels set in ancient Egypt
Fiction set in the 26th century BC
Novels set in the 10th century BC
Djedefre